Frank Ludvig Spitzer (July 24, 1926 – February 1, 1992) was an Austrian-born American mathematician who made fundamental contributions to probability theory, including the theory of random walks, fluctuation theory, percolation theory, the Wiener sausage, and especially the theory of interacting particle systems. Rare among mathematicians, he chose to focus broadly on "phenomena", rather than any one of the many specific theorems that might help to articulate a given phenomenon. His book Principles of Random Walk, first published in 1964, remains a well-cited classic.

Spitzer was born into a Jewish family in Vienna, Austria, and by the time he was twelve years old, the Nazi threat in Austria was evident. His parents were able to send him to a summer camp for Jewish children in Sweden, and, as a result, Spitzer spent all of the war years in Sweden. He lived with two Swedish families, learned Swedish, graduated from high school, and for one year attended Tekniska Hogskolan in Stockholm.

During the war years, Spitzer's parents and his sister were able to make their way to the United States by passing through the unoccupied parts of France and North Africa, and, after the war, Spitzer joined his family in their new country.  Spitzer enlisted in the U.S. Army just as the war in Europe was ending. After completing his military service in 1947, Spitzer entered the University of Michigan (Ann Arbor) to study mathematics. His studies went quickly, and he completed his B.A. and Ph.D. in just six years.

Spitzer's first academic appointments were at the California Institute of Technology (1953–1958), but most of his academic career was spent at Cornell University, with leaves at the Institute for Advanced Study in Princeton and the Mittag-Leffler Institute in Sweden. Among his many honors, Spitzer was a member of the National Academy of Sciences.

Publications

References

External links

Harry Kesten, "Frank Ludvig Spitzer", Biographical Memoirs of the National Academy of Sciences (1996)

1926 births
1992 deaths
Austrian mathematicians
American people of Austrian-Jewish descent
20th-century American mathematicians
University of Michigan College of Literature, Science, and the Arts alumni
KTH Royal Institute of Technology alumni
Probability theorists
Members of the United States National Academy of Sciences